Ipomoea amnicola is a species of plant in the bindweed family, Convolvulaceae. It is commonly called redcenter morning-glory. It is found in Mexico, much of South America and has been successfully introduced in the US states of Arkansas, Missouri and Texas.

References

amnicola
Flora of South America
Flora of Mexico
Flora of Missouri
Flora of Texas
Flora without expected TNC conservation status